Scopula alma is a moth of the family Geometridae. It was described by Prout in 1920. It is endemic to Kenya.

References

Endemic moths of Kenya
Moths described in 1920
alma
Endemic fauna of Kenya
Moths of Africa
Taxa named by Louis Beethoven Prout